The MacArthur Bridge is a road bridge crossing the Pasig River between Padre Burgos Avenue in Ermita and the intersection of Plaza Santa Cruz, Carriedo Street, Carlos Palanca Street, and Muelle del Banco Nacional in Santa Cruz. It replaced the Santa Cruz Bridge, which was destroyed during World War II. The bridge is named after General Douglas MacArthur, whose military operations led to the liberation of the Philippines during World War II.

History
The MacArthur Bridge replaced the older Santa Cruz Bridge, which was bombed when the Japanese retreated on the Battle of Manila. The bridge was constructed after the war and opened in 1952.

Use on the procession of the Black Nazarene
The bridge is originally used as part of the route of the procession during the Feast of the Black Nazarene every January 9 from 2007 to 2013. After the Department of Public Works and Highways called the bridge unstable to carry millions of devotees, processions are rerouted to the adjacent Jones Bridge.

Douglas MacArthur monument
A monument for Douglas MacArthur stood on the foot of the south end of the bridge. The monument first stood in the facade of Pamantasan ng Lungsod ng Maynila, before it was moved into its present location after 1997.

See also
List of crossings of the Pasig River
List of places named for Douglas MacArthur

References

Beam bridges
Bridges completed in 1952
Bridges in Manila
Buildings and structures in Ermita
Buildings and structures in Santa Cruz, Manila
Concrete bridges
Road bridges in Asia